Subsolanoides is a genus of butterflies in the family Lycaenidae. It is a monotypic genus, containing the single species Subsolanoides nagata, which is endemic to China.

References 

Polyommatini
Lycaenidae genera
Monotypic butterfly genera